Lawrence Mestel (born April 2, 1962) is an American music executive and businessman. He is the founder and CEO of Primary Wave.

Early life and education
Mestel was born in Brooklyn, New York to Zelig and Rita (née Miller) Mestel.

Mestel grew up in Marlboro, New Jersey and graduated from Marlboro High School in 1980, where he played basketball and tennis. He studied business at University of Massachusetts Amherst, graduating cum laude in 1984 on the Dean's List. He was accepted into the MBA program at NYU Stern School of Business, but declined after receiving a job offer from Chris Blackwell to join Island Records.

Career

Early career
Mestel was appointed Chief Operating Officer for Island Entertainment Group in 2000, which included Island Records, Island Music Publishing and Island Pictures. From 2000 – 2004, Mestel was Executive Vice President and General Manager at Arista Records. Mestel was responsible for the label's sales, marketing, A&R administration, finance and business affairs.

Mestel was Chief Operating Officer and General Manager of Virgin Records from 2004 – 2005, where he oversaw marketing, sales and business development.

Primary Wave

In January 2006, Mestel started a private, independent music publishing company, Primary Wave, after raising $50 million and acquiring 25% of Kurt Cobain’s portion of the Nirvana (band) song catalog from Courtney Love.  As music IP owners, in its early years Primary Wave used lyrics and artists name and likeness to form brand deals with companies like Converse, the Massachusetts Lottery, and Funny or Die. As of 2020, the company controls and manages approximately $1.5 billion of cash and assets.

Credits

Further reading 
Buying a Piece of Bob Marley’s Song Catalog, and His Enduring Legacy at New York Times, January 13, 2018.
Stevie Nicks Sells Stake in Songwriting Catalog at The Wall Street Journal, December 4, 2020
Bloomberg Profile: Larry Mestel

References

External links
 
 
 Lawrence Mestel on LinkedIn

1962 births
Living people
Isenberg School of Management alumni
American chief executives
Marlboro High School alumni
People from Marlboro Township, New Jersey
American chief operating officers